Saint-Michel is a commune in the Aisne department in Hauts-de-France in northern France. It is also unofficially called Saint-Michel-en-Thiérache.

Population

Personalities
 French Revolution leader Antoine Joseph Santerre, whose family moved from Saint-Michel to Paris before the Revolution.

See also
 Communes of the Aisne department

References

Thiérache
Communes of Aisne
Aisne communes articles needing translation from French Wikipedia